Kibwezi East is a constituency in Kenya. It is one of six constituencies in Makueni County.

References 

Constituencies in Makueni County